The 1920 United States presidential election in Kansas was held on November 2, 1920 as part of the 1920 United States presidential election. Kansas voters chose ten electors to the Electoral College, who voted for president and vice president.

Kansas voted for the Republican nominee, Ohio Senator Warren G. Harding, over the Democratic nominee, Ohio Governor James M. Cox. Harding ran with Massachusetts Governor Calvin Coolidge, while Cox ran with Assistant Secretary of the Navy Franklin D. Roosevelt of New York.

Harding won the state by a margin of 32.23 percentage points.

By the beginning of 1920 skyrocketing inflation and President Woodrow Wilson's focus upon his proposed League of Nations at the expense of domestic policy had helped make the incumbent President very unpopular – besides which Wilson also had major health problems that had left First Lady Edith Wilson effectively running the nation.

Political unrest observed in the Palmer Raids and the "Red Scare" further added to the unpopularity of the Democratic Party, since this global political turmoil produced considerable fear of alien revolutionaries invading the country. Another issue was the anti-Cox position taken by the Ku Klux Klan, and Cox's inconsistent stance on newly passed Prohibition – he had been a "wet" but announced he would support Prohibition enforcement in August

The West had been the chief presidential battleground ever since the "System of 1896" emerged following that election. For this reason, Cox chose to tour the entire nation but the only attention Cox received in the Western press was severe criticism. Moreover, at the beginning of the presidential campaign farmers – a critical constituency in Kansas – were highly critical of the likely effect of the Cox platform upon their cost of living.

Because Wilson had carried Kansas in his two election triumphs in 1912 and 1916. Cox did visit the state in early October, but was aggressively heckled during his only speeches in the state. Surveys earlier by Progressive journalist William Allen White had shown that two-thirds of the Kansas population were opposed to Wilson's League of Nations.

At the end of October, two days before the poll, editors estimated a majority of one hundred and twenty thousand votes for Harding in Kansas, although Cox's campaign managers, especially Frank E. Doremus, believed they had a chance of holding the state.

Vote
As it turned out, Harding easily won the Sunflower State by a two-to-one majority, fifty percent larger than predicted by the combined polls of editors at the end of October, and a swing of 37 percentage points from Wilson's victory in the state in 1916. Harding carried all 105 Kansas counties, whereas in 1916 Charles Evans Hughes had carried only 26, although the trend – dramatic as it was – was substantially smaller than Harding's landslides in heavily German-American North and South Dakota.

Full results

Results by county

See also
 United States presidential elections in Kansas

References

1920
Kansas
1920 Kansas elections